Márcio Henrique Borges Hahn (born 3 July 1977) is a Brazilian football coach and former player who played as a midfielder. He is the current assistant manager of Santos.

Playing career
Known as Márcio during his playing days, he was born in Torres, Rio Grande do Sul, and played for local sides well into his 20s, notably winning the 2000 Campeonato Gaúcho with Caxias. He moved to Internacional for the 2002 season, featuring regularly before moving to Cruzeiro in 2003.

After featuring rarely for Cruzeiro, Márcio signed for Mogi Mirim. He later represented Novo Hamburgo (four stints), Juventude, São Caetano, 15 de Novembro, Atlético Paranaense, ABC, Grêmio Barueri and Brasil de Pelotas before returning to Caxias in May 2011.

Márcio returned to Novo Hamburgo for a fifth spell ahead of the 2012 season, and later rejoined Brasil de Pelotas in 2013. He left the latter on 3 May 2016, as his contract was not renewed, and signed for Esportivo on 23 January 2017. He retired shortly after, at the age of 39.

Post-playing career
Shortly after retiring, Hahn was named Lisca's assistant at Guarani. He subsequently followed the manager to Criciúma, Ceará, América Mineiro, Vasco da Gama, Sport Recife and Santos.

Honours

Player
Atlético Paranaense
Campeonato Paranaense: 1997

Caxias
Campeonato Gaúcho: 2000

Internacional
Campeonato Gaúcho: 2002

Cruzeiro
Campeonato Mineiro: 2003, 2004
Copa do Brasil: 2003
Campeonato Brasileiro Série A: 2003

Novo Hamburgo
Copa FGF: 2005

ABC
Campeonato Potiguar: 2008

Brasil de Pelotas
Campeonato Gaúcho Série A2: 2013

References

External links

1977 births
Living people
Sportspeople from Rio Grande do Sul
Brazilian footballers
Campeonato Brasileiro Série A players
Campeonato Brasileiro Série B players
Campeonato Brasileiro Série C players
Campeonato Brasileiro Série D players
Association football defenders
Sociedade Esportiva e Recreativa Caxias do Sul players
Sport Club Internacional players
Cruzeiro Esporte Clube players
Mogi Mirim Esporte Clube players
Esporte Clube Novo Hamburgo players
Esporte Clube Juventude players
Associação Desportiva São Caetano players
Clube 15 de Novembro players
Club Athletico Paranaense players
ABC Futebol Clube players
Grêmio Barueri Futebol players
Grêmio Esportivo Brasil players
Clube Esportivo Bento Gonçalves players
Santos FC non-playing staff